Jastrabá is a village and municipality in Žiar nad Hronom District in the Banská Bystrica Region of central Slovakia. 
The first notice in 1487.

Genealogical resources

The records for genealogical research are available at the state archive "Statny Archiv in Banska Bystrica, Slovakia"

 Roman Catholic church records (births/marriages/deaths): 1710-1896 (parish A)
 Lutheran church records (births/marriages/deaths): 1666-1891 (parish B)

See also
 List of municipalities and towns in Slovakia

External links
 
 
Surnames of living people in Jastraba

Villages and municipalities in Žiar nad Hronom District